"Hymn" is a song by American electronica musician Moby. It was released on May 16, 1994, as the first single from his third studio album, Everything Is Wrong (1995). The single version, which was radically remixed from the album original and retitled "Hymn (This Is My Dream)", peaked at number 31 on the UK Singles Chart and number three in Finland. A 33-minute ambient remix was released as "Hymn.Alt.Quiet.Version".

Critical reception 
Steve Baltin from Cash Box described "Hymn" as a "beautiful piano tune". Andy Beevers from Music Week gave it four out of five. He wrote, "Moby can always be relied on to come up with a novel and commercial twist on the house formula. This time he goes for a full-blown choral treatment with the hard-edged synth sounds."

Track listings 
 CD single 
 "Hymn (This Is My Dream)" – 3:45
 "All That I Need Is to Be Loved" (H.O.S. mix) – 2:45
 "Hymn" (European edit) – 8:57
 "Hymn" (Laurent's Wake Up) – 8:43

 CD single 
 "Hymn.Alt.Quiet.Version" – 33:43 

 12-inch single 
 "Hymn (This Is My Dream)" (extended mix) – 4:42
 "Hymn" (Laurent's Wake Up) – 8:43
 "Hymn (Upriver)" – 5:47
 "Hymn (Dirty Hypo)" – 7:20

 12-inch single 
 "Hymn (Menacing)" – 5:57
 "Hymn" (European mix) – 7:02
 "Hymn (Lucky Orgasm)" – 6:03
 "Hymn (I Believe)" – 7:08

Charts

References

External links 
 

1994 singles
1994 songs
Moby songs
Mute Records singles
Songs written by Moby